A sloop is a sailboat with a single mast typically having only one headsail in front of the mast and one mainsail aft of (behind) the mast. Such an arrangement is called a fore-and-aft rig, and can be rigged as a Bermuda rig with triangular sails fore and aft, or as a gaff-rig with triangular foresail(s) and a gaff rigged mainsail. 

In naval terminology, "sloop-of-war" refers to the purpose of the craft, rather than to the specific size or sail-plan, and thus a sloop should not be confused with a sloop-of-war. The term is also used loosely with other sail plans, as with the Friendship Sloop,  which is a cutter.

Origins 
The name originates from the Dutch sloep, which is related to the Old English slūpan, to glide. A sloop is usually regarded as a single-masted rig with a single headsail and a fore-and-aft mainsail. In this form, the sloop is the commonest of all sailing rigswith the Bermuda sloop being the default rig for leisure craft, being used on types that range from simple cruising dinghies to large racing yachts with high-tech sail fabrics and large powerful winches.If the vessel has two or more headsails, the term cutter may be used, especially if the mast is stepped further aft.

Variations 
Before the introduction of the marconi rig, a sloop might carry one or more square-rigged topsails which will be hung from a topsail yard and be supported from below by a crossjack. 

A sloop's headsail may be masthead-rigged or fractional-rigged. On a masthead-rigged sloop, the forestay (on which the headsail is carried) attaches at the top of the mast. On a fractional-rigged sloop, the forestay attaches to the mast at a point below the top. A sloop may use a bowsprit, a spar that projects forward from the bow.

See also
 Mast aft rig, a single mast rig with a mast further back than a sloop or cutter.
 Chialoup, an historical type of sloop produced in the East Indies.
 Bermuda sloop, originally used for a type of sea-going, sloop-rigged vessel. Today used for any Bermuda-rigged sloop.
 Bermuda Fitted Dinghy: a scaled-down sloop used for racing in Bermuda.
 Hope: an example of a traditional sail-powered oyster-dredging sloop.

Notes

References

External links

Sloops
Sailing rigs and rigging
Sailboat types
Oyster sloops
Pirate ships
Tall ships